Gorgopotamos ( meaning the rushing river), may refer to:

Gorgopotamos, a village, a municipality and a historic bridge in Phthiotis, Greece
Gorgopotamos (river), a river in Phthiotis, Greece
Gorgopotamos, Ioannina, a village in the Ioannina regional unit, Greece